Milen Stoev (born 29 September 1999) is a Bulgarian professional footballer who plays as a defender for Arda Kardzhali.

References

External links
 

1999 births
Living people
Bulgarian footballers
First Professional Football League (Bulgaria) players
OFC Vihren Sandanski players
FC Arda Kardzhali players
OFC Pirin Blagoevgrad players
Association football defenders
People from Sandanski
Sportspeople from Blagoevgrad Province